Karenza Mathews (née Smith) is a female former international table tennis player from England.

Table tennis career
She represented England at five World Table Tennis Championships in the Corbillon Cup (women's team event) from 1967 to 1975. She also reached the quarter-finals of the Women's Doubles with Mary Shannon-Wright and the Mixed Doubles with Denis Neale in 1967.

Karenza was England number one and won 231 senior caps and won a bronze medal in the team event at the European Table Tennis Championships in 1970.

She won an English Open title and 15 English National Table Tennis Championships titles.

Personal life
She married Kenneth Mathews on 18 May 1968.

See also
 List of England players at the World Team Table Tennis Championships

References

English female table tennis players
1950 births
Living people